Antoine Rivard (November 14, 1898 – December 26, 1985) was a French Canadian politician.

Background

He was born in Quebec City on November 14, 1898. He was an attorney and a professor. He was on active military service during World War I and World War II.

Member of the legislature

Rivard unsuccessfully ran as a Union Nationale candidate to the Legislative Assembly of Quebec in the district of Québec-Centre in 1944. He was elected in the riding of Montmagny in 1948. He was re-elected in 1952 and 1956.

Cabinet Member

He was appointed to Premier Maurice Duplessis's Cabinet in 1948, serving as Minister without Portfolio, Solicitor General from 1950 to 1959 and Minister of Transportation and Communications from 1954 to 1960. Duplessis, who has often been accused of having authoritarian ways, is believed to have once told Rivard in public, "Toé, tais-toé!" (You hush!) 

Rivard lost re-election by a margin of nine votes in 1960.

Death

He died on December 26, 1985.

References 

1898 births
1985 deaths
Lawyers in Quebec
Union Nationale (Quebec) MNAs
Canadian military personnel of World War I
Canadian military personnel of World War II
Université Laval alumni
Academic staff of Université Laval